Life is beautiful is FLOW's fifth single. It reached #28 on the Oricon charts in its first week and charted for 4 weeks. *

Track listing

References

2004 singles
Flow (band) songs
2004 songs
Ki/oon Music singles